is a Japanese jazz musician who plays alto saxophone, sopranino saxophone, banjo, and flute. He is known for his bossa nova recordings, although his work encompasses many styles, with collaborations from musicians all over the world.

Career
Watanabe was born on 1 February 1933 in Utsunomiya, Japan. His father, a professional musician, sang and played the biwa. Watanabe was attracted to jazz from an early age, in part due to the strong cultural influence stemming from the American post-war presence in Japan. He learned the clarinet while in high school after convincing his father over the course of six weeks to buy him a second-hand instrument.

In 1951, Watanabe moved to Tokyo and began playing the alto saxophone. He started studying the flute in 1953 with Ririko Hayashi from the Tokyo Philharmonic Orchestra. Watanabe joined Toshiko Akiyoshi's Cozy Quartet and began leading the group when Akiyoshi moved to the USA. By 1958, Watanabe had performed with leading musicians and quartets. In 1961, his first album as a leader, the self-titled Sadao Watanabe, was released. 

In 1962, he left Japan to study at Berklee College of Music in Boston. Studying led Watanabe to a broadened stylistic scope that began to incorporate Brazilian music. During his time in the USA, he worked with Gary McFarland, Chico Hamilton, and Gábor Szabó. 

Returning to Tokyo, Watanabe became the director of the new Yamaha Institute of Popular Music, a school that based its curriculum on Berklee's. From 1966 onwards, he toured Japan and internationally with his own quartet, playing bop, Brazilian music, jazz-rock, soul, and pop music. He played with the John Coltrane quintet in Tokyo while the group was touring Japan in 1966. By the time Watanabe played at the 1970 Newport Jazz Festival, he was a well-known and often highly-regarded jazz performer.

In 1969, Watanabe began working part time as a radio broadcaster, promoting jazz across Japan. From 1972, his programme My Dear Life ran for 20 years. He continued to perform internationally, including performances at Montreux Jazz Festival and Newport Jazz Festival. In 1970, he released his album Round Trip, featuring Chick Corea, Jack DeJohnette, and Miroslav Vitouš. 
Watanabe continued performing and recording throughout the 1970s and 1980s, amassing a catalogue of more than 70 albums as leader. 

In addition to his musical career, Watanabe has published six photography books in Japan.

Watanabe has been in charge of the visiting professor of Jazz course at Kunitachi College of Music since 2010.

Honors
Among Watanabe's awards are the Order of the Rising Sun, the imperial medal of honor for contribution to the arts, and the Fumio Nanri award.

1995: Berklee College of Music awarded him an honorary doctorate degree for his contributions to music. 
2005: 
2015: Order of Rio Branco

Discography

As leader/co-leader

As sideman 

With Ithamara Koorax
 Red River (Paddle Wheel, 1995)
 Rio Vermelho (Imagem, 1995)
 The Luiz Bonfa Songbook (Huks, 2002)

With Masabumi Kikuchi
 Collaboration (Philips, 1970)
 All About Dancing Mist (Philips, 1971)

With Masahiko Togashi
 Song for Myself (East Wind, 1974)
 Spiritual Nature (East Wind, 1975)

With others
 Toshiko Akiyoshi, Toshiko Meets Her Old Pals (King, 1961)
 Randy Brecker and Eliane Elias, Amanda (Passport, 1985)
 Randy Crawford, Through the Eyes of Love (Warner Bros., 1992)
 Hiroshi Fukumura, Hunt Up Wind (Flying Disk, 1978)
 Dave Grusin, Live in Japan (JVC, 1980) – live
 Don Grusin, The Hang (C.A.R.E., 2004)
 Chico Hamilton, El Chico (Impulse!, 1965)
 Terumasa Hino, Live in Concert (East Wind, 1975) – live
 Akira Miyazawa, Yamame (King, 1977)
 Armando Manzanero, El Piano (BMG/RCA, 1995)
 Cesar Camargo Mariano, Mitos (CBS, 1988)
 Gary McFarland, The In Sound  (Verve, 1966)
 Armando Peraza, Wild Thing (Skye, 1969)
 Greg Phillinganes, Significant Gains (Planet, 1981)
 Santana, At Budokan (Masterplan, 2007)
 Isao Suzuki, My Spare Time (Flying Disk, 1978)
 Gabor Szabo, Gypsy '66 (Impulse!, 1966)
 Toquinho, Vamos Juntos Toquinho Live at Bravas Club '86 (Polydor, 1986) – live

Compilation albums 
 Selected (Elektra, 1988) 
 Sadao Watanabe Vocal Collection (Elektra, 1991)
 Sadao Watanabe My Dear Life 50th Anniversary Collection (Verve, 2001)
 Sketches of Nature (Verve, 2005)
 Broadcast Tracks '69–'72 (Victor, 2005)
 Love Songs (Victor, 2018)

References

External links
Official website

1933 births
Living people
21st-century saxophonists
Berklee College of Music alumni
Japanese jazz musicians
Japanese jazz saxophonists
Musicians from Tochigi Prefecture
People from Utsunomiya, Tochigi
Recipients of the Order of the Rising Sun, 4th class